The Alfa Romeo 1900 M (better known by its nickname Alfa Romeo Matta, meaning "mad") is a four-wheel drive utility vehicle produced by Italian car manufacturer Alfa Romeo from 1951 to 1954. Developed on request of the Italian Ministry of Defence, it was made in both military (AR 51) and civilian (AR 52) versions.

History
The AR 51 (Autovettura da Ricognizione, "Reconnaissance Car") was the result of the request of a light reconnaissance vehicle for use on paved, unpaved and mountain roads. 
A civilian version, the AR 52, was later developed from the military AR 51; several variants were made, adapted for use in agriculture, firefighting, and road maintenance.

The Matta was built from 1952 to 1954, with 2,007 military AR 51s for the Italian Army and 154 civilian AR 52 units produced. In 1954, the Italian army abandoned the AR 51 and switched to the Fiat Campagnola, which was mechanically simpler.

Specifications
The Matta was powered by a 1884 cc twin cam, 8-valve inline-four engine with dry sump lubrication. The cylinder head was aluminium and featured hemispherical combustion chambers, while the engine block was cast iron.

Gallery

References

Bibliography

External links
 http://www.alfamatta.co.uk/
 Italian registry website

Matta
Off-road vehicles
All-wheel-drive vehicles
Military light utility vehicles
Military vehicles of Italy
1950s cars
Vehicles introduced in 1952